Sarychev Peak (Vulkan Sarycheva, variants:  Fuyō Mountain,
 Fuyō-san,
 Fuyō-yama,
 Fuyo-zan,
 Huyō San,  Matsuwa-fuji) is an active stratovolcano covering almost the entirety of Matua Island in the Kuril Islands, Russia. It is a young, highly symmetrical stratovolcanic cone.

History 
The peak was named after admiral Gavril Sarychev of the Imperial Russian Navy.

2009 eruption 
The volcano erupted June 11–21, 2009, sending out ash plumes. As the volcano is near some of the main air routes between East Asia and North America, there was some disruption to air traffic.

During an early stage of the eruption, on June 12, 2009, the International Space Station passed overhead and astronauts photographed the event.  A hole in the overhead clouds, possibly caused by the shock wave from the explosion, allowed a clear view of the  plume and pyroclastic flow down the sides of the mountain.  A cap-like pileus cloud is visible atop the rising column.

Sarychev Peak previously erupted in 1760, 1805, 1879, 1923, 1927, 1928, 1930, 1932, 1946, 1954, 1960, 1965, 1976, 1986 and 1989.

Gallery

See also
 List of volcanoes in Russia

References

External links

 

Matua (island)
Stratovolcanoes of Russia
Active volcanoes
VEI-4 volcanoes
21st-century volcanic events
Articles containing video clips
Holocene stratovolcanoes